The Toul-Rosières Solar Park is a 115 megawatt (MW) solar farm located at the Toul-Rosières Air Base, in France. Among other organisations the Air Base formerly housed the 21st Fighter-Bomber Group of the United States Air Force in the late 1950s.

The Park is the largest solar power station using photovoltaic technology in France. The project is developed by EDF Énergies Nouvelles (EDF EN).

The solar park has about 1.4 million thin-film PV panels based on CdTe technology made by the US company First Solar.

In 2012, the Luxembourg-based Marguerite Fund acquired 36 MW stake in the solar park.  24 MW stake was sold to the independent power producer Sonnedix.

See also 

Photovoltaic power stations
List of photovoltaic power stations
Solar power in France

References 

Photovoltaic power stations in France